General elections were held in American Samoa in November 1970, alongside a multi-question referendum. Voters elected members of the eleventh Fono, and for the first time, an unofficial American Samoan delegate to the United States House of Representatives. A. U. Fuimaono, a high chief and Director of Agriculture, was elected as the islands' delegate.

Results

Senate

House of Representatives

References

American Samoa
1970 United States House of Representatives elections
1970 in American Samoa
Elections in American Samoa
November 1970 events in Oceania